The Apartheid Museum is a museum in Johannesburg, South Africa, illustrating apartheid and the 20th-century history of South Africa. The museum, part of the Gold Reef City complex, was opened in November 2001.

At least five times a year, events are held at the museum to celebrate the end of apartheid and the start of multiracial democracy for the people of South Africa.

Exhibits 
The Pillars of the Constitution is the first exhibit visitors see when visiting the Apartheid Museum. Located in the courtyard, it includes one pillar for each of the seven values that are enshrined in the South African Constitution: democracy, equality, reconciliation, diversity, responsibility, respect and freedom.

Race Classification is both an entry point and exhibit. Apartheid was built on divisions by race: native, white, coloured, and Asian. Required identity documents indicated one's race, and these are on view in this exhibit. Visitors to the museum have just entered at this point, using one of two entrances, white and non-white, based on randomly generated entrance tickets. The actual items one sees in the exhibit is determined by which entry point one has had to use.

The next exhibit, which is outside on the way to the museum building, is Journeys. It includes large photos of the descendants of individuals who came to Johannesburg in the aftermath of the discovery of gold in 1886. There was a wide racial diversity amongst these individuals. Apartheid was designed to segregate individuals from different races. When walking through this exhibit, one encounters the backs of these individuals, as if they are walking in the same direction as the visitor is heading. By turning back once one has passed a photograph, it is possible to see the person from the front.

The Segregation exhibit provides background on the official policy of segregation that became a feature of the union of South Africa, which was formed in 1910. Blacks and white women were not allowed to vote under this policy. Segregation laid the way for apartheid.

References

External links

 
 Apartheid Museum Guide

Museums established in 2001
Museums in Johannesburg
Organisations associated with apartheid
Apartheid museums
21st-century architecture in South Africa